Vlašim is a town in Benešov District in the Central Bohemian Region of the Czech Republic. It has about 11,000 inhabitants. Vlašim is known for its castle and English style park.

Administrative parts

Villages of Bolina, Domašín, Hrazená Lhota, Nesperská Lhota, Polánka and Znosim are administrative parts of Vlašim.

Geography
It is situated in the Vlašim Uplands on the Blanice river.

History
The castle is Vlašim was probably built in 1303 by Hynek of Vlašim. The first written mention of the castle and therefore of Vlašim is from 1318.

Demographics

Economy
Commuting to Prague is very common in Vlašim. The most significant engineering factory in Vlašim is Sellier & Bellot, manufacturing ammunition. Packaging machinery companies are also successful worldwide and employ local people.

Transport
Vlašim is situated on the Benešov–Trhový Štěpánov railway line.

Vlašim aerodrome, LKVL, has been re-opened in 2019 for national public traffic.

Culture

The castle park hosts an annual festival on 1 May, which is a public holiday in the Czech Republic.

Sport
The town is home to an association football team, FC Sellier & Bellot Vlašim, which plays in the Czech National Football League, the second tier of Czech football.

Sights
The Vlašim Castle is the main landmark of the town. The original Gothic castle was rebuilt in the 16th century. It is surrounded with an English landscape garden with many pieces of romantic architecture such as the Chinese pavilion, Old castle and its three gates.

The Church of Saint Giles is a late Gothic building from 1522–1523.

Notable people
Jan Očko of Vlašim (?–1380), Archbishop of Prague
Miluše Poupětová (born 1963), artist
Marcela Krinke-Susmelj (born 1965), Czech-Swiss dressage rider
Luboš Kozel (born 1971), football player and manager
Libor Procházka (born 1974), ice hockey player
Stanislav Vlček (born 1976), footballer
Michal Rozsíval (born 1978), ice hockey player
Michal Řepík (born 1988), ice hockey player

See also
The Votive Panel of Jan Očko of Vlašim
House of Vlašim

References

External links

 (in Czech)
History of Vlašim Family

Populated places in Benešov District
Cities and towns in the Czech Republic